Močioci is a village in Bosnia and Herzegovina. According to the 1991 census, the village is located in the municipality of Stari Grad, Sarajevo.

Demographics 
According to the 2013 census, its population was 5, all Serbs.

References

Populated places in Stari Grad, Sarajevo